Youcat, short for Youth Catechism of the Catholic Church, also styled as YOUCAT, is a 2011 publication that aims to be an aid for youth to better understand the Catechism of the Catholic Church. The book, presented in the form of questions and answers, is intended for use by Catholic youths around the world and is available in 25 languages, including Arabic and Chinese. Youcat is based on the Catechism of the Catholic Church and the Compendium of the Catechism of the Catholic Church (2005). The catechism has 304 pages and consists of four chapters with 527 questions and answers.

The guide, whose foreword was written by Pope Benedict XVI, was authored by Cardinal Christoph Schönborn and others. Approximately 700,000 copies of Youcat were distributed in thirteen different languages on behalf of the Pope during World Youth Day 2011 in Madrid.

Background

YOUCAT series 

The international YOUCAT book series also includes:

A prayerbook:
 Georg von Lengerke / Dörte Schrömges, YOUCAT Youth Prayer Book, Munich 2011. 
A confirmation book:
 Bernhard Meuser / Nils Baer, YOUCAT confirmation book, 
A leader's guide for the confirmation course:
 Nils Baer, YOUCAT Confirmation Leader's Handbook

Errors 
In some translations of the Youcat, such as French, Italian and Spanish, errors have been found that deviate from official doctrine regarding questions about many important issues such as euthanasia and contraception. The Vatican has announced that these mistakes will be corrected in future editions.

Sexuality

The presentation of the Church's teaching about sexuality and chastity occurs in paragraphs 400 to 417, including the teaching about sexual relations being for marriage only. The Youcat teaches that

References

External links
Official YOUCAT website
Youcat FAQ

Catechisms of the Catholic Church
2011 books
Pope Benedict XVI